Elizabeth Fisher Read (1872 – December 13, 1943) was a scholar and Women's Suffrage activist, and one of Eleanor Roosevelt's most dear friends.

Early life
Elizabeth Fisher Read was born in New Brighton, Pennsylvania, in 1872.

She graduated from Smith College and University of Pennsylvania Law School.

Career
In the 1910s, Read was a Women's Suffrage activist and represented the ideology of the New Woman, financially independent, politically active, and socially emancipated. She was active in social and political causes and was an influential figure in the League of Women Voters in New York City.

Read was a practicing lawyer; she was the director of research for the American Foundation of which her partner, Lape, was director.

Read wrote a book on international law, International Law and International Relations (1925), translated and edited a book on the World Court, and helped Lape edit a book on expert medical testimony. In 1923 she collaborated with Lape and Gustav Frenssen to Klaus Hinrich Baas: The Story Of A Self-made Man....

Personal life

Read lived with Esther Lape, educator and publicist, in Greenwich Village, at 20 East 11th Street, where today a plaque said Eleanor Roosevelt lived here when she was first lady. The building was actually owned by Lape. Roosevelt rented an apartment for a time. Nearby, at 171 West 12th Street, lived other lesbian couples involved in the Woman's Suffrage movement and of the close-knit circle of friends of Roosevelt: Marion Dickerman and Nancy Cook, Molly Dewson and Polly Porter, Grace Hutchins and Anna Rochester.

Read was Eleanor Roosevelt's friend. They first met in 1920 when Roosevelt became the director of the League of Women Voters' national legislation committee. After 1921, she was her political and feminist mentor, became Roosevelt's personal attorney and financial advisor. With her life partner, Lape, and others, she was part of Roosevelt's support network of female friends.  

Read and Lape also owned a country house, Salt Meadow, Westbrook, Connecticut, where Roosevelt was often a guest. In 1972, after Read's death, Lape donated Salt Meadow to the U.S. Fish and Wildlife Service. The estate is currently the Stewart B. McKinney National Wildlife Refuge. Refuge staff are working on a National Register of Historical Places submission for the former Salt Meadow estate that will recognize the same-sex relationship of Lape and Read.

Elizabeth Fisher Read died in New York on December 13, 1943.

References

1872 births
1943 deaths
American women lawyers
American feminists
Lesbian feminists
LGBT people from Pennsylvania
People from New Brighton, Pennsylvania
University of Pennsylvania Law School alumni